The Ven Matthew Woodford, MA (1738 – 1807) was Archdeacon of Winchester from 1795 until 1807.

Born to Mary nee Brideoake (sic.) and Mathew Woodford Esq. he was baptized on 22nd July 1738 in Southampton and  educated at Christ Church, Oxford, where he matriculated in 1755, graduating B.A. in 1759. A Chaplain to George III, he held livings at Tadmarton, Chilbolton and Upham.

Of his siblings his brother Ralph was created 1st of the Woodford Baronets of Carleby , Lincolnshire, his sister Anne married Peter Thellusson a Caribbean merchant and financier who has an extensive entry in The Oxford Dictionary of National Biography.

He died on 30 September 1807. and was buried in Winchester Cathedral and a mural tablet erected in the North Presbytery Aisle.

Notes

1773 births
Alumni of Christ Church, Oxford
Archdeacons of Winchester
1828 deaths
Clergy from Southampton